Henriette Julie Herz (née de Lemos) (September 5, 1764 – October 22, 1847) is best known for the "salonnieres" or literary salons that she started with a group of emancipated Jews in Prussia.

Biography
She was the daughter of a physician, Benjamin de Lemos (1711–1789), descended from a Portuguese Jewish family of Hamburg, and Esther de Lemos (née Charleville) (1742–1817). 

Henriette Herz had grown up in the Berlin of the Jewish emancipation and had shared tutors apparently with Moses Mendelssohn's daughters.  At age fifteen, she married a physician, seventeen years her senior. Markus Herz had studied medicine at the University of Königsberg, one of only three universities that accepted Jews—but only in its medical faculty. She was said to be an extremely beautiful woman.

After a few years the salon split in two, a science-seminar led by her husband and a literary salon by Henriette herself. Most notable men and women in Berlin were said to have attended her salon. Among her friends and acquaintances were Dorothea von Schlegel, Wilhelm von Humboldt, Jean Paul, Friedrich Schiller, Mirabeau, Friedrich Rückert, Karl Wilhelm Ramler, Johann Jakob Engel, Georg Ludwig Spalding, the Danish Barthold Georg Niebuhr, Johannes von Müller, the sculptor Schadow, Salomon Maimon, Friedrich von Gentz, Fanny von Arnstein, Madame de Genlis, Alexander zu Dohna-Schlobitten, Gustav von Brinkmann, and Friedrich Schlegel.

Alexander von Humboldt often visited and even received Hebrew lessons from Henriette. The theologian Friedrich Schleiermacher was another frequent visitor. After the death of her husband she came under the powerful influence of Schleiermacher and converted to Protestantism. Her grave is preserved in the Protestant Friedhof II der Jerusalems- und Neuen Kirchengemeinde (Cemetery No. II of the congregations of Jerusalem's Church and New Church) in Berlin-Kreuzberg, south of Hallesches Tor.

References

Further reading

External links

 Painting of Henriette Herz
 Henriette Herz: Ihr Leben und ihre Erinnerungen (Google eBook)

1764 births
1847 deaths
Converts to Protestantism from Judaism
18th-century German Jews
German Protestants
German Sephardi Jews
People from Berlin
People from the Margraviate of Brandenburg
German salon-holders
Jewish women
People of the Haskalah